Night Driver, Night Drivers, or, variation, may refer to:

Music
 Night Driver Tour 2017, a 2017 album concert tour by Busted
 The Night Drivers, a band formed by Chris Jones

Albums
 Night Driver (album), a 2016 album by Busted
 Night//Driver, a 2006 song by Steinar Raknes and Erik Nylander and the Ola Kvernberg Trio

Songs
 "Night Driver", a 2016 song by Busted from the eponymous album Night Driver
 "Night Driver", a 2015 song by Blind Idiot God from the album Before Ever After
 "Night Driver", a 2009 song by Andrew W.K. from the album 55 Cadillac
 "Night Driver", a 2006 song by Tom Petty from the album Highway Companion

Other uses
 Night Driver (video game), a 1976 video cabinet arcade game from Atari
 The Night Driver, an Australian crime podcast; see List of Australian crime podcasts
 "Night Drivers", an episode of Amphibia

See also

 
 Night (disambiguation)
 Driver (disambiguation)
 Night Drive (disambiguation)